Gonialoe dinteri, the Namibian partridge aloe, is a species of flowering plant in the Asphodelaceae family. It is native to arid areas of Angola and Namibia.

Description

The plants form stemless rosettes of up to 30 cm wide. Smaller suckers sometimes offshoot from the main stem. The long sharp, triangular leaves are dark brownish green with white linear spots and cartilaginous margins. Tall, very thin multi-branched inflorescences appear from January to March, with small sparse pale pink and sometimes bluish flowers.

It is named after German botanist Kurt Dinter. Taxonomically, it was formerly part of the Serrulatae series of three very closely related Aloe species, together with Gonialoe variegata and Gonialoe sladeniana. Recent phylogenetic studies have shown these three species to constitute an entirely separate genus, what was published under the name Gonialoe.

While this species looks rather similar to its two sister species, it can be distinguished from Gonialoe sladeniana by its longer leaves which curve downwards, and it can be distinguished from Gonialoe variegata by its large size, taller thinner sparser inflorescence, and the spots on its leaves being more linear, almost to the point of being stripes. The bracts of G.dinteri are 3 nerved, unlike its sister species which are 1 nerved. G.dinteri also has an unusually large root stock; its roots form a far larger percentage of its body weight than all the rest of the plant put together.

Distribution

Gonialoe dinteri is found in sparse populations across a large arid area of Namibia and around the verges of the Namib desert. It usually occurs in deep cracks in limestone or granite rock, or growing under scrub. It is listed in the IUCN Red List under the species synonym Aloe dinteri.

What little rain there is in this area, tends to fall in the summer. Towards the south, as the climate gradually gives way to a winter-rainfall climate, Gonialoe dinteri is replaced by Gonialoe sladeniana which inhabits the central intermediate zone, and finally by Gonialoe variegata even further south where winter-rainfall climate predominates.

Cultivation
This species can be grown in cultivation, but needs dry conditions and very well-drained porous soil. It is relatively cold-hardy, due to the low nighttime temperatures of its desert habitat.

References

dinteri
Flora of Angola
Flora of Namibia
Least concern plants
Least concern biota of Africa
Taxonomy articles created by Polbot
Taxa named by Alwin Berger
Taxa named by John Charles Manning
Taxobox binomials not recognized by IUCN